Neandra brunnea, the pole borer, is a species of the longhorn beetle family, subfamily Parandrinae. Its range includes the entire eastern portion of North America. It can be seen between March and November.

References

Beetles described in 1798
Beetles of North America
Parandrinae